William Orlando Smith (June 13, 1859 – May 12, 1932) was a U.S. Representative from the state of Pennsylvania.

Biography
Smith was born in Reynoldsville, Pennsylvania on June 13, 1859.  He learned the printing trade, and worked as publisher of the Reynoldsville Herald from 1876 to 1879.

He worked in the Government Printing Office in Washington, D.C., from 1879 to 1884.  He returned to Punxsutawney, Pennsylvania, in 1884 and successively edited the Punxsutawney Tribune and the Punxsutawney Spirit.

He was a member of the Pennsylvania House of Representatives from 1889 to 1898.  He worked as editor of the Bradford Daily Era in Bradford, Pennsylvania in 1891.  He purchased a half interest in the Punxsutawney Spirit in January 1892.

Smith was elected as a Republican to the Fifty-eighth and Fifty-ninth Congresses (1903 to 1907).  He was not a candidate for renomination in 1906.  After his time in Congress, he resumed his newspaper interests in Punxsutawney.

He died in Cleveland, Ohio on May 12, 1932.  Interment was at Circle Hill Cemetery in Punxsutawney.

References

Sources

Newspapers.com

Books

External links

William O. Smith at The Political Graveyard

1859 births
1932 deaths
Republican Party members of the Pennsylvania House of Representatives
American newspaper editors
American newspaper publishers (people)
Republican Party members of the United States House of Representatives from Pennsylvania